The Decline of the West (more literally, The Downfall of the Occident), is a two-volume work by Oswald Spengler. The first volume, subtitled Form and Actuality, was published in the summer of 1918. The second volume, subtitled Perspectives of World History, was published in 1922. The definitive edition of both volumes was published in 1923.

Spengler introduced his book as a "Copernican overturning"—a specific metaphor of societal collapse—involving the rejection of the Eurocentric view of history, especially the division of history into the linear "ancient-medieval-modern" rubric. According to Spengler, the meaningful units for history are not epochs but whole cultures which evolve as organisms.  In his framework, the terms "culture" and "civilization" were given non-standard definitions and cultures are described as having lifespans of about a thousand years of flourishing, and a thousand years of decline.  To Spengler, the natural lifespan of these groupings was to start as a "race"; become a "culture" as it flourished and produced new insights; and then become a "civilization".  Spengler differed from others in not seeing the final civilization stage as necessarily "better" than the earlier stages; rather, the military expansion and self-assured confidence that accompanied the beginning of such a phase was a sign that the civilization had arrogantly decided it had already understood the world and would stop creating bold new ideas, which would eventually lead to a decline.  For example, to Spengler, the Classical world's culture stage was in Greek and early Roman thought; the expansion of the Roman Empire was its civilization phase; and the collapse of the Roman and Byzantine Empires their decline.  He believed that the West was in its "evening", similar to the late Roman Empire, and approaching its eventual decline despite its seeming power.

Spengler recognized at least eight high cultures: Babylonian, Egyptian, Chinese, Indian, Mesoamerican (Mayan/Aztec), Classical (Greek/Roman, "Apollonian"), the non-Babylonian Middle East ("Magian"), and Western or European ("Faustian").  Spengler combined a number of groups under the "Magian" label; "Semitic", Arabian, Persian, and the Abrahamic religions in general as originating from them (Judaism, Christianity, Islam).  Similarly, he combined various Mediterranean cultures of antiquity including both Ancient Greece and Ancient Rome as "Apollonian", and modern Westerners as "Faustian".  According to Spengler, the Western world was ending and the final season, the "winter" of Faustian Civilization, was being witnessed. In Spengler's depiction, Western Man was a proud but tragic figure because, while he strives and creates, he secretly knows the actual goal will never be reached.

General context
Spengler said that he conceived the book sometime in 1911 and spent three years to finish the first draft. At the start of World War I, he began revising it and completed the first volume in 1917. It was published the following year when Spengler was 38 and was his first work, apart from his doctoral thesis on Heraclitus. The second volume was published in 1922. The first volume is subtitled Form and Actuality; the second volume is Perspectives of World-history. Spengler's own view of the aims and intentions of the work were described in the Prefaces and occasionally at other places.

The book received unfavorable reviews from most scholars even before the release of the second volume. And the stream of criticisms continued for decades. Nevertheless, in Germany the book enjoyed popular success: by 1926 some 100,000 copies were sold.

A 1928 Time review of the second volume of Decline described the immense influence and controversy Spengler's ideas enjoyed in the 1920s: "When the first volume of The Decline of the West appeared in Germany a few years ago, thousands of copies were sold. Cultivated European discourse quickly became Spengler-saturated. Spenglerism spurted from the pens of countless disciples. It was imperative to read Spengler, to sympathize or revolt. It still remains so."

Overview 

Spengler's world-historical outlook was informed by many philosophers, including Goethe and to some degree Nietzsche. He described the significance of these two German philosophers and their influence on his worldview in his lecture Nietzsche and His Century. He called his analytical approach "Analogy. By these means we are enabled to distinguish polarity and periodicity in the world."

Morphology was a key part of Spengler's philosophy of history, using a methodology which approached history and historical comparisons on the basis of civilizational forms and structure, without regard to function.

In a footnote, Spengler described the essential core of his philosophical approach toward history, culture, and civilization:
Plato and Goethe stand for the philosophy of Becoming, Aristotle and Kant the philosophy of Being... Goethe's notes and verse... must be regarded as the expression of a perfectly definite metaphysical doctrine. I would not have a single word changed of this: "The Godhead is effective in the living and not in the dead, in the becoming and the changing, not in the become and the set-fast; and therefore, similarly, the reason is concerned only to strive towards the divine through the becoming and the living, and the understanding only to make use of the become and the set-fast. (Letter to Eckermann)" This sentence comprises my entire philosophy.

Scholars now agree that the word "decline" more accurately renders the intended meaning of Spengler's original German word "Untergang" (often translated as the more emphatic "downfall"; "Unter" being "under" and "gang" being "going", it is also accurately rendered in English as the "going under" of the West). Spengler said that he did not mean to describe a catastrophic occurrence, but rather a protracted fall—a "twilight" or "sunset" (Sonnenuntergang is German for sunset, and Abendland, the German word for the West or the Occident, literally means the "evening land"). In 1921, Spengler wrote that he might have used in his title the word Vollendung (which means 'fulfillment' or 'consummation') and saved a great deal of misunderstanding. Nevertheless, "Untergang" can be interpreted in both ways, and after World War II, some critics and scholars chose to read it in the cataclysmic sense.

Spenglerian terms 
Spengler invested certain terms with unusual meanings not commonly encountered in everyday discourse.

Culture/Civilization 
Spengler used the two terms in a specific manner, loading them with particular values. For him, Civilization is what a Culture becomes once its creative impulses wane and become overwhelmed by critical impulses. Culture is the becoming, Civilization is the thing become. Rousseau, Socrates, and Buddha each mark the point where their Cultures transformed into Civilization. They each buried centuries of spiritual depth by presenting the world in rational terms—the intellect comes to rule once the soul has abdicated.

Apollonian/Magian/Faustian
These are Spengler's terms for Classical, Arabian and Western Cultures respectively.

Apollonian Culture and Civilization is focused around Ancient Greece and Rome. Spengler saw its world view as being characterized by appreciation for the beauty of the human body, and a preference for the local and the present moment. The Apollonian world sense was described as ahistorical, citing Thucydides' claim in his Histories that nothing of importance had happened before him. Spengler said that the Classical Culture did not feel the same anxiety as the Faustian when confronted with an undocumented event.  
Magian Culture and Civilization includes the Jews from about 400 BC, early Christians and various Arabian religions up to and including Islam. He described it as having a world feeling that revolved around the concept of world as cavern, epitomized by the domed Mosque, and a preoccupation with essence. Spengler saw the development of this Culture as being distorted by a too-influential presence of older Civilizations, the initial vigorous expansionary impulses of Islam being in part a reaction against this.
Faustian According to Spengler, the Faustian culture began in Western Europe around the 10th century, and had such expansionary power that by the 20th century it was covering the entire earth, with only a few regions where Islam provided an alternative world view. He described it as having a world feeling inspired by the concept of infinitely wide and profound space, the yearning towards distance and infinity. The term "Faustian" is a reference to Goethe's Faust (Johann Wolfgang von Goethe had a massive effect on Spengler), in which a dissatisfied Intellectual is willing to make a pact with the Devil in return for unlimited knowledge. Spengler believed that this represented the Western Man's limitless metaphysic, unrestricted thirst for knowledge, and constant confrontation with the Infinite.

Pseudomorphosis
The concept of pseudomorphosis is one that Spengler borrows from mineralogy and is introduced as a way of explaining what he calls half-developed or only partially manifested Cultures. Specifically, pseudomorphosis refers to an older Culture or Civilization being so deeply ingrained that a young Culture cannot find its own form and full expression of itself. In Spengler's words, this leads to the young soul being cast in the old molds, young feelings then stiffen in senile practices, and instead of expanding creatively, it fosters hate toward the older Culture.

Spengler believed that a Magian pseudomorphosis began with the Battle of Actium, in which the gestating Arabian Culture was represented by Mark Antony and lost to the Classical Civilization. The battle was different from the conflict between Rome and Greece, which had been fought out at Cannae and Zama, with Hannibal being the representative of Hellenism. He said that Antony should have won at Actium, and his victory would have freed the Magian Culture, but his defeat imposed Roman Civilization on it.

In Russia, Spengler saw a young, undeveloped Culture in a pseudomorphosis under the Faustian (Petrine) form. He said that Peter the Great distorted the tsarism of Russia to the dynastic form of Western Europe. The burning of Moscow, as Napoleon was set to invade, he described as a primitive expression of hatred toward the foreigner. In the following entry of Alexander I into Paris, the Holy Alliance and the Concert of Europe, he said that Russia was forced into an artificial history before its culture was ready or capable of understanding its burden. This would result in a hatred toward Europe, which Spengler said poisoned the womb of an emerging new Culture in Russia. While he does not name the Culture, he said that Tolstoy is its past and Dostoyevsky is its future.

Becoming/Being
For Spengler, becoming is the basic element and being is static and secondary, not the other way around. He said that his philosophy in a nutshell is contained in these lines from Goethe: "the God-head is effective in the living and not in the dead, in the becoming and the changing, not in the become and the set-fast; and therefore, similarly the intuition is concerned only to strive towards the divine through the becoming and the living, and logic only to make use of the become and the set-fast".

Blood
Spengler described blood as the only power strong enough to overthrow money, which he saw as the dominant power of his age. Blood is commonly understood to mean race-feeling, and this is partially true but misleading. Spengler's idea of race had nothing to do with ethnic identity, and indeed he was hostile to racists in that sense. The book talks about a population becoming a race when it is united in outlook, regardless of ethnic origins. Spengler talks about the final struggle with money also being a battle between capitalism and socialism, but again socialism with a specific definition: "the will to call into life a mighty politico-economic order that transcends all class interests, a system of lofty thoughtfulness and duty sense." He also writes "A power can be overthrown only by another power, not by a principle, and only one power that can confront money is left. Money is overthrown and abolished by blood. Life is alpha and omega ... It is the fact of facts ... Before the irresistible rhythm on the generation-sequence, everything built up by the waking–consciousness in its intellectual world vanishes at the last." Therefore, if we wanted to replace blood by a single word it would be more correct to use "life-force" rather than "race-feeling".

Spengler's Cultures 
Spengler said that eight Hochkulturen or high cultures have existed: Babylonian, Egyptiac, Indic, Sinic, Mesoamerican (Mayan/Aztec), Apollonian or Classical (Greek/Roman), Magian or Arabian, and Faustian or Western (European)

The "Decline" is largely concerned with the Classical and Western (and to some degree Magian) Cultures, but some examples are taken from the Chinese and Egyptian. He said that each Culture arises within a specific geographical area and is defined by its internal coherence of style in terms of art, religious behavior and psychological perspective. In addition, each Culture is described as having a conception of space which is expressed by an "Ursymbol". Spengler said that his idea of Culture is justifiable through the existence of recurrent patterns of development and decline across the thousand years of each Culture's active lifetime.

Spengler did not classify the Southeast Asian and Peruvian (Incan, etc.) cultures as Hochkulturen.  He thought that Russia was still defining itself, but was bringing into being a Hochkultur.  The Indus Valley civilization had not been discovered at the time he was writing, and its relationship with later Indian civilization remained unclear for some time.

Meaning of history 
Spengler distinguished between ahistorical peoples and peoples caught up in world history. While he recognized that all people are a part of history, he said that only certain Cultures have a wider sense of historical involvement, meaning that some people see themselves as part of a grand historical design or tradition, while others view themselves in a self-contained manner and have no world-historical consciousness.

For Spengler, a world-historical view is about the meaning of history itself, breaking the historian or observer out of a crude, culturally parochial classification of history. By learning about different courses taken by other civilizations, people can better understand their own culture and identity. He said that those who still maintain a historical view of the world are the ones who continue to "make" history. Spengler said that life and humankind as a whole have an ultimate aim. However, he maintains a distinction between world-historical peoples, and ahistorical peoples—the former will have a historical destiny as part of a High Culture, while the latter will have a merely zoological fate. He said that world-historical man's destiny is self-fulfillment as a part of his Culture. Further, Spengler said that not only is pre-cultural man without history, he loses his historical weight as his Culture becomes exhausted and becomes a more and more defined Civilization.

For example, Spengler classifies Classical and Indian civilizations as ahistorical, comparing them to the Egyptian and Western civilizations which developed conceptions of historical time. He sees all Cultures as equal in the study of world-historical development. This leads to a kind of historical relativism or dispensationalism. Historical data, in Spengler's mind, are an expression of their historical time, contingent upon and relative to that context. Thus, the insights of one era are not unshakable or valid in another time or Culture—"there are no eternal truths," and each individual has a duty to look beyond one's own Culture to see what individuals of other Cultures have with equal certainty created for themselves. He said that what is significant is not whether the past thinkers' insights are relevant today, but whether they were exceptionally relevant to the great facts of their own time.

Culture and Civilization 

Spengler's conception of Culture was organic: primitive Culture is simply the sum of its constituent and incoherent parts (individuals, tribes, clans, etc.). Higher Culture, in its maturity and coherence, becomes an organism in its own right, according to Spengler. A Culture is described as sublimating the various customs, myths, techniques, arts, peoples, and classes into a single strong undiffused historical tendency.

Spengler divided the concepts of Culture and Civilization, the former focused inward and growing, the latter outward and merely expanding. However, he sees Civilization as the destiny of every Culture. The transition is not a matter of choice—it is not the conscious will of individuals, classes, or peoples that decides. He said that while Cultures are "things-becoming", Civilizations are the "thing-become", with the distinction being that Civilizations are what Cultures become when they are no longer creative and growing. As the conclusion of a Culture's arc of growth, Civilizations are described as outwardly focused, and in that sense artificial or insincere. As an example, Spengler used the Greeks and Romans, saying that the imaginative Greek Culture declined into wholly practical Roman Civilization.

Spengler also compared the "world-city" and -province (urban and rural) as concepts analogous to Civilization and Culture respectively, with the city drawing upon and collecting the life of broad surrounding regions. He said there is a "true-type" rural-born person, in contrast to city-dwellers who are allegedly nomadic, traditionless, irreligious, matter-of-fact, clever, unfruitful, and contemptuous of the countryman. In his view, the cities contain only a "mob", not a people, and are hostile to the traditions that represent Culture (in Spengler's view these traditions are: nobility, the Christian Church, privileges, dynasties, convention in art, and limits on scientific knowledge). He said that city-dwellers possess cold intelligence that confounds peasant wisdom, a naturalism in attitudes towards sex which are a return to primitive instincts, and a reduced inner religiousness. Further, Spengler saw urban wage disputes and large entertainment expenditures as the final aspects that signal the closing of Culture and the rise of the Civilization.

Spengler had a low opinion of Civilizations, even those that engaged in significant expansion, because he said that expansion was not actual growth. One of his principal examples was that of Roman "world domination". In his view, the Romans faced no significant resistance to their expansion, meaning it was not an achievement as they did not so much conquer their empire, but rather simply took possession of that which lay open to everyone. Spengler said this is a contrast with Roman displays of Cultural energy during the Punic Wars. After the Battle of Zama, Spengler believes that the Romans never waged, or even were capable of waging, a war against a competing great military power.

Races, peoples, and cultures 
According to Spengler, a race has "roots", like a plant, which connect it to a landscape. "If, in that home, the race cannot be found, this means the race has ceased to exist. A race does not migrate. Men migrate, and their successive generations are born in ever-changing landscapes; but the landscape exercises a secret force upon the extinction of the old and the appearance of the new one." In this instance, he uses the word "race" in the tribal and cultural rather than the biological sense, a 19th-century use of the word still common when Spengler wrote.

For this reason, he said a race is not exactly like a plant:

Spengler writes that, 

He distinguishes this from the sort of pseudo-anthropological notions commonly held when the book was written, and he dismisses the idea of "an Aryan skull and a Semitic skull". He also does not believe language is itself sufficient to create races, and that "the mother tongue" signifies "deep ethical forces" in Late Civilizations rather than Early Cultures, when a race is still developing the language that fits its "race-ideal".

Closely connected to race, Spengler defined a "people" as a unit of the soul, saying, "The great events of history were not really achieved by peoples; they themselves created the peoples. Every act alters the soul of the doer." He described such events as including migrations and wars, saying that the American people did not migrate from Europe, but were formed by events such as the American Revolution and the US Civil War. "Neither unity of speech nor physical descent is decisive." He said that what distinguishes a people from a population is "the inwardly lived experience of 'we'", and that this exists so long as a people's soul lasts: "The name Roman in Hannibal's day meant a people, in Trajan's time nothing more than a population." In Spengler's view, "Peoples are neither linguistic nor political nor zoological, but spiritual units."

Spengler disliked the contemporary trend of using a biological definition for race, saying, "Of course, it is quite often justifiable to align peoples with races, but 'race' in this connexion must not be interpreted in the present-day Darwinian sense of the word. It cannot be accepted, surely, that a people were ever held together by the mere unity of physical origin, or, if it were, could maintain that unity for ten generations. It cannot be too often reiterated that this physiological provenance has no existence except for science—never for folk-consciousness—and that no people was ever stirred to enthusiasm by this ideal of blood purity. In race (Rasse haben) there is nothing material but something cosmic and directional, the felt harmony of a Destiny, the single cadence of the march of historical Being. It is the incoordination of this (wholly metaphysical) beat which produces race hatred... and it is resonance on this beat that makes the true love—so akin to hate—between man and wife."

To Spengler, peoples are formed from early prototypes during the Early phase of a Culture. In his view, "Out of the people-shapes of the Carolingian Empire—the Saxons, Swabians, Franks, Visigoths, Lombards—arise suddenly the Germans, the French, the Spaniards, the Italians." He describes these peoples as products of the spiritual "race" of the great Cultures, and "people under a spell of a Culture are its products and not its authors. These shapes in which humanity is seized and moulded possess style and style-history no less than kinds of art or mode of thought. The people of Athens is a symbol not less than the Doric temple, the Englishman not less than modern physics. There are peoples of Apollonian, Magian, and Faustian cast ... World history is the history of the great Cultures, and peoples are but the symbolic forms and vessels in which the men of these Cultures fulfill their Destinies."

In saying that race and culture are tied together, Spengler echoes ideas similar to those of Friedrich Ratzel and Rudolf Kjellén. These ideas, which figure prominently in the second volume of the book, were common throughout German culture at the time.

In his later works, such as Man and Technics (1931) and The Hour of Decision (1933), Spengler expanded upon his "spiritual" theory of race and tied it to his metaphysical notion of eternal war and his belief that "Man is a beast of prey". The authorities however banned the book.

Religion 
Spengler differentiates between manifestations of religion that appear within a Civilization's developmental cycle. He sees each Culture as having an initial religious identity, which arises out of the fundamental principle of the culture, and follows a trajectory correlating with that of the Culture. The Religion eventually results in a reformation-like period, after the Culture-Ideal has reached its peak and fulfillment. Spengler views a reformation as representative of decline: the reformation is followed by a period of rationalism, and then a period of second religiousness that correlates with decline. He said that the intellectual creativity of a Culture's Late period begins after the reformation, usually ushering in new freedoms in science.

According to Spengler, the scientific stage associated with post-reformation Puritanism contains the fundamentals of Rationalism, and eventually rationalism spreads throughout the Culture and becomes the dominant school of thought. To Spengler, Culture is synonymous with religious creativeness, and every great Culture begins with a religious trend that arises in the countryside, is carried through to the cultural cities, and ends in materialism in the world-cities.

Spengler believed that Enlightenment rationalism undermines and destroys itself, and described a process that passes from unlimited optimism to unqualified skepticism. He said that Cartesian self-centered rationalism leads to schools of thought that do not cognize outside of their own constructed worlds, ignoring actual every-day life experience, and applies criticism to its own artificial world until it exhausts itself in meaninglessness. In his view, the masses give rise to the Second Religiousness in reaction to the educated elites, which manifests as deep suspicion of academia and science.

Spengler said that the Second Religiousness is a harbinger of the decline of mature Civilization into an ahistorical state and occurs concurrently with Caesarism, the final political constitution of Late Civilization. He describes Caesarism as the rise of an authoritarian ruler, a new 'emperor' akin to Caesar or Augustus, taking the reins in reaction to a decline in creativity, ideology and energy after a Culture has reached its high point and become a Civilization. He said that the Second Religiousness and Caesarism demonstrate a lack of youthful strength or creativity, and the Second Religiousness is simply a rehashing of the original religious trend of the Culture.

Spengler maintains that the West will revert to its roots before the Great Schism of 1054, returning to Orthodox Christianity by 2100, as noted by Archimandrite Justin Popovich in his "The Orthodox Church and Ecumenism" (Lazarica Press, Birmingham, England, 2000).

This aligns neatly with the final parts of the Anonymous Prophecy of Mount Athos of 1053, parts 1-12 of which have already been fulfilled, and part 13 of which is unfolding, amongst others. See www.byzantineprophecy.org.

Democracy, media, and money 
Spengler said that democracy is the political weapon of "money", and the media are the means through which money operates a democratic political system. The penetration of money's power throughout a society is described as another marker of the shift from Culture to Civilization.

Democracy and plutocracy are equivalent in Spengler's argument, and he said the "tragic comedy of the world-improvers and freedom-teachers" is that they are simply assisting money to be more effective. He believed that the principles of equality, natural rights, universal suffrage, and freedom of the press are all disguises for class war of the bourgeois against the aristocracy. Freedom, to Spengler, is a negative concept, only entailing the repudiation of any tradition. He said that freedom of the press requires money, and entails ownership, meaning that it serves money. Similarly, since suffrage involves electoral campaigns, which involve donations, elections serve money as well. Spengler said that the ideologies espoused by candidates, whether Socialism or Liberalism, are set in motion by, and ultimately serve, only money.

Spengler said that in his era money has already won, in the form of democracy. However, he said that in destroying the old elements of the Culture, it prepares the way for the rise of a new and overpowering figure, who he calls the Caesar. Before such a leader, money collapses, and in the Imperial Age the politics of money fades away.

Spengler said that the use of one's constitutional rights requires money, and that voting can only work as designed in the absence of organized leadership working on the election process. He said that if the election process is organized by political leaders, to the extent that money allows, the vote ceases to be truly significant. In his view, it is no more than a recorded opinion of the masses on the organizations of government over which they possess no positive influence. He said that the greater the concentration of wealth in individuals, the more the fight for political power revolves around questions of money. He believed that this was the necessary end of mature democratic systems, rather than being corruption or degeneracy.

On the subject of the press, Spengler said that instead of conversations between men, the press and the "electrical news-service keep the waking-consciousness of whole people and continents under a deafening drum-fire of theses, catchwords, standpoints, scenes, feelings, day by day and year by year." He said that money uses the media to turn itself into force—the more spent, the more intense its influence. In addition, a functioning press requires universal education, and he said schooling leads to a demand for the shepherding of the masses, which then becomes an object of party politics. To Spengler, people who believe in the ideal of education prepare the way for the power of the press, and eventually for the rise of the Caesar. He also said there is no longer a need for leaders to impose military service, because the press will stir the public into a frenzy and force their leaders into a conflict.

Spengler believed that the only force which can counter money is blood. He said that Marx's critique of capitalism was put forth in the same language and on the same assumptions as capitalism, meaning it is more a recognition of capitalism's veracity, than a refutation. He said the only aim of Marxism is to "confer upon objects the advantage of being subjects."

Reception 
The Decline of the West was widely read by German intellectuals. It has been suggested that it intensified a sense of crisis in Germany following the end of World War I. George Steiner suggested that the work can be seen as one of several books that resulted from the crisis of German culture following Germany's defeat in World War I, comparable in this respect to the philosopher Ernst Bloch's The Spirit of Utopia (1918), the theologian Franz Rosenzweig's The Star of Redemption (1921), the theologian Karl Barth's The Epistle to the Romans (1922), Nazi Party leader Adolf Hitler's Mein Kampf (1925), and the philosopher Martin Heidegger's Being and Time (1927).

In 1950, the philosopher Theodor W. Adorno published an essay entitled "Spengler after the Downfall" (in ) to commemorate what would have been Spengler's 70th birthday. Adorno reassessed Spengler's thesis three decades after it had been put forth, in light of the catastrophic destruction of Nazi Germany (although Spengler had not meant "Untergang" in a cataclysmic sense, this was how most authors after World War II interpreted it). As a member of the Frankfurt School of Marxist critical theory, Adorno said he wanted to "turn (Spengler's) reactionary ideas toward progressive ends." He believed that Spengler's insights were often more profound than those of his more liberal contemporaries, and his predictions more far-reaching. Adorno saw the rise of the Nazis as confirmation of Spengler's ideas about "Caesarism" and the triumph of force-politics over the market. Adorno also drew parallels between Spengler's description of the Enlightenment and his own analysis. However, Adorno also criticized Spengler for an overly deterministic view of history, which ignored the unpredictable role that human initiative plays at all times. He quoted the Austrian poet Georg Trakl (1887-1914): "How sickly seem everything that grows" (from the poem "Heiterer Frühling") to illustrate that decay contains new opportunities for renewal. He also criticizes Spengler's use of language, which he called overly reliant on fetishistic terms like "Soul", "Blood" and "Destiny." Pope Benedict XVI disagrees with Splenger's “biologistic” thesis, citing the arguments of Arnold J. Toynbee, who distinguishes between "technological-material progress" and spiritual progress in Western civilizations.

Influence on others 
 Shamil Basayev: Chechen warlord given Decline as a gift by a Russian radio journalist. He reportedly read it in one night and settled on his plan to organize life in the Chechen Republic of Ichkeria.
 Samuel Huntington seems to have been heavily influenced by Spengler's The Decline of the West in his "Clash of Civilizations" theory.
Joseph Campbell, an American professor, writer, and orator best known for his work in the fields of comparative mythology and comparative religion claimed Decline of the West was his biggest influence.
 Northrop Frye, reviewing the Decline of the West, said that "If... nothing else, it would still be one of the world's great Romantic poems".
 Oswald Mosley identified the book as critical in his political conversion from far-left to far-right politics and his subsequent foundation of the British Union of Fascists.
 Ludwig Wittgenstein named Spengler as one of his philosophical influences.
 Camille Paglia has listed The Decline of the West as one of the influences on her 1990 work of literary criticism Sexual Personae.
 William S. Burroughs referred repeatedly to Decline as a pivotal influence on his thoughts and work.
 Martin Heidegger was deeply affected by Spengler's work, and referred to him often in his early lecture courses.
 James Blish used many of Spengler's ideas in his books Cities in Flight.
 Francis Parker Yockey wrote Imperium: The Philosophy of History and Politics, published under the pen name Ulick Varange in 1948. This book is described in its introduction as a "sequel" to The Decline of the West.
 Whittaker Chambers often refers to "Crisis," a concept influenced by Spengler, in Witness (more than 50 pages, including a dozen times on the first page mentioned), in Cold Friday (1964, more than 30 pages), and in other pre-Hiss Case writings ("His central feeling, repeated in hundreds of statements and similies, is that the West is going into its Spenglerian twilight, a breaking down in which Communism is more a symptom than an agent.")

Editions
 Spengler, Oswald. The Decline of the West. Ed. Arthur Helps, and Helmut Werner. Trans. Charles F. Atkinson. Preface Hughes, H. Stuart. New York: Oxford UP, 1991. 
 Unabridged versions of both volumes of The Decline of the West (Form & Actuality and its follow-up Perspectives of World-History) were reissued by Arktos Media in 2021, which also retain the original English translations by Charles Francis Atkinson.

See also 
 Historic recurrence
 Social cycle theory

References

Further reading 
 William H. McNeill, 1963 [1991]. The Rise of the West: A History of the Human Community [With a Retrospective Essay], University of Chicago Press, . Synopsis, Table of Contents Summary and scrollable preview.
 Scruton, Roger, "Spengler's Decline of the West" in The Philosopher on Dover Beach, Manchester: Carcanet Press, 1990.

External links 
 Spengler, Oswald, The Decline of the West v. 1 (©1926) and v. 2 (©1928), Alfred A. Knopf (Dead link.)
 Unabridged text 

1918 non-fiction books
Books about civilizations
Books about the West
German non-fiction books
Universal history books
Works about nihilism
Works by Oswald Spengler
Criticism of rationalism
Declinism
Works about the philosophy of history
Works about the theory of history
 Right-wing anti-capitalism